Eunidiopsis bicolor is a species of beetle in the family Cerambycidae, and the only species in the genus Eunidiopsis. It was described by Breuning in 1939.

References

Eunidiini
Beetles described in 1939